In Deep is the fourth studio album by Argent, originally released by Epic Records in October 1973. It features the original full-length recording of "God Gave Rock and Roll to You", which reached No. 18 in the UK charts (U.S. No. 114) when released in edited form as a single later the same year. It was remade by Kiss as "God Gave Rock 'n' Roll to You II" for the film Bill & Ted's Bogus Journey in 1991.
The album reached #69 in Canada.

Track listing

Personnel 
Argent
 Russ Ballard – electric and acoustic guitars, lead vocals
 Rod Argent – organ, backing vocals, piano, electric piano, Mellotron; lead vocals on "Christmas for the Free"
 Jim Rodford – bass, backing vocals
 Robert Henrit – drums, percussion
Additional personnel
Derek Griffiths – guitar solo on "Christmas for the Free" (Ballard was taken ill in the studio)

References

1973 albums
Argent (band) albums
Epic Records albums
Albums produced by Rod Argent
Albums produced by Chris White (musician)